The 1993–94 OPJHL season is the first season of the Ontario Provincial Junior A Hockey League (OPJHL). The nine teams of the East Division competed in a 40-game schedule, while the eight teams of the West Division played a 42-game schedule.  The top 8 teams of each division make the playoffs.

The winner of the OPJHL playoffs, the Orillia Terriers, failed to win the 1996 Buckland Cup for the OHA championship.

Changes
League changes name from Central Junior A Hockey League to Ontario Provincial Junior A Hockey League.
League joins Canadian Junior A Hockey League.
Hamilton Kiltys join OPJHL from GHJHL.
Caledon Canadians leave OPJHL for MetJHL.
Mississauga Derbys move and become Streetsville Derbys.

Final standings
Note: GP = Games played; W = Wins; L = Losses; OTL = Overtime losses; SL = Shootout losses; GF = Goals for; GA = Goals against; PTS = Points; x = clinched playoff berth; y = clinched division title; z = clinched conference title

1993-94 OPJHL Playoffs

Division Quarter-final
Hamilton Kiltys defeated Royal York Rangers 4-games-to-none
Burlington Cougars defeated Georgetown Raiders 4-games-to-none
Streetsville Derbys defeated Brampton Capitals 4-games-to-2
Oakville Blades defeated Milton Merchants 4-games-to-2
Orillia Terriers defeated Collingwood Blues 4-games-to-none
Newmarket 87's defeated Peterborough Jr. Petes 4-games-to-none
Barrie Colts defeated Ajax Axemen 4-games-to-1
Cobourg Cougars defeated Markham Waxers 4-games-to-2
Division Semi-final
Hamilton Kiltys defeated Streetsville Derbys 4-games-to-3
Oakville Blades defeated Burlington Cougars 4-games-to-none
Orillia Terriers defeated Cobourg Cougars 4-games-to-none
Newmarket 87's defeated Barrie Colts 4-games-to-1
Division Final
Hamilton Kiltys defeated Oakville Blades 4-games-to-3
Orillia Terriers defeated Newmarket 87's 4-games-to-1
Final
Orillia Terriers defeated Hamilton Kiltys 4-games-to-2

OHA Buckland Cup Championship
The 1994 Dudley Hewitt Cup was hosted by the Caledon Canadians in North York, Ontario.  The Orillia Terriers lost in the final.

Round Robin
Orillia Terriers defeated Powassan Hawks (NOJHL) 1-0
Orillia Terriers defeated Wexford Raiders (MetJHL) 4-3 OT
Orillia Terriers defeated Caledon Canadians (MetJHL) 3-0

Final
Caledon Canadians (MetHL) defeated Orillia Terriers 3-1

Players selected in 1994 NHL Entry Draft
Rd 4 #79 Adam Copeland - Edmonton Oilers (Burlington Cougars)

See also
 1994 Centennial Cup
 Dudley Hewitt Cup
 List of OJHL seasons
 Northern Ontario Junior Hockey League
 Superior International Junior Hockey League
 Greater Ontario Junior Hockey League

References

External links
 Official website of the Ontario Junior Hockey League
 Official website of the Canadian Junior Hockey League

Ontario Junior Hockey League seasons
OPJHL